Yevhen Tsymbalyuk (born 19 June 1996) is a Ukrainian professional footballer who plays as a defender for Urartu.

Career

Olimpik Donetsk
Tsymbalyuk is a product of the Olimpik Donetsk youth system. He made his debut for Olimpik Donetsk against FC Illichivets Mariupol on 30 May 2015 in the Ukrainian Premier League. He went on to help the side qualify for the semi-final of the 2014–15 Ukrainian Cup and the 2017–18 Europa League third qualifying round. On 24 November 2019 he scored against Karpaty Lviv.

Desna Chernihiv
On 16 July 2021 he signed a two-year contract with Desna Chernihiv of the Ukrainian Premier League. After the 2022 Russian invasion of Ukraine, however, his contract was cancelled.

Urartu
On 14 September 2022, he moved to Urartu in Armenian Premier League. On 30 October he scored his first goal against Lernayin Artsakh.

International career
On 27 March 2018 he appeared for the Ukraine under-21 squad in a match against England.

Career statistics

Club

References

External links 
 Profile on Official FC Urartu website
 Profile on Official FC Desna Chernihiv website

1996 births
Living people
People from Lyman, Ukraine
Ukrainian footballers
FC Olimpik Donetsk players
FC Desna Chernihiv players
FC Urartu players
Ukrainian Premier League players
Armenian Premier League players
Association football forwards
Ukraine under-21 international footballers
Sportspeople from Donetsk Oblast
Expatriate footballers in Armenia
Ukrainian expatriate sportspeople in Armenia